Magical Connection is an album by Hungarian guitarist Gábor Szabó featuring performances recorded in 1970 and released on the Blue Thumb label.

Reception
The Allmusic review states "Consciously more percussive -- and more commercial -- Szabo's newly formed sextet was clearly up to the challenges of combining rock with jazz. More an instrumental-pop confection, Magical Connection doesn't quite live up to its promise. But even as Szabo covers pop hits by Carpenters, Buffalo Springfield and John Sebastian, he often plays with great wit and solos with energetic dexterity".

Track listing
 "Sombrero Sam" (Charles Lloyd) - 5:14  
 "(They Long to Be) Close to You" (Burt Bacharach, Hal David) - 3:04  
 "Country Illusion" (Wolfgang Melz) - 3:45
 "Lady With Child" (Chuck Blore, Jerry Wright, Don Richman) - 3:45  
 "Pretty Girl Why" (Stephen Stills) - 3:31  
 "Hum a Song" (Richard Ross) - 3:32  
 "Magical Connection" (John Sebastian) - 4:26  
 "Fred and Betty" (Gábor Szabó, Richard Thompson) - 4:53  
 "Love Theme from "Spartacus"" (Alex North) - 3:13 
Recorded in Los Angeles, California on May 27 (track 1), June 3 (track 6), June 5 (tracks 4 & 7), June 10 (track 3), June 13 (track 5), June 15 (track 2), June 27 (tracks 5, 8 & 9) and July 8 (overdubs), 1970

Personnel
Gábor Szabó - guitar
Lynn Blessing - vibraphone
Richard Thompson - keyboards
Wolfgang Melz - bass
Jim Keltner - drums
Emil Richards, Hal Gordon - percussion
Erno Neufeld - concertmaster
George Kast, Marilyn Baker, Jack Gootkin, Henry Ferber, Ambrose Russo, Leonard Malarsky, Jerome Reisler - violin
Allan Harshman, Myron Sandler - viola
Anne Goodman, Frederick Seykora - cello
Jules Chaikin - contractor
Nick DeCaro - keyboards arranger, conductor

Charts
Album – Billboard

References

Blue Thumb Records albums
Gábor Szabó albums
1970 albums
Albums produced by Tommy LiPuma